Ivan Novović (born 26 April 1989) is a Montenegrin professional footballer who currently plays for FK Dečić.

References

1989 births
Living people
Association football defenders
Montenegrin footballers
FK Zeta players
FC Krasnodar players
OFK Titograd players
Montenegrin First League players
Russian First League players
Montenegrin expatriate footballers
Expatriate footballers in Russia
Montenegrin expatriate sportspeople in Russia